Alexander Thomas Augusta (March 8, 1825December 21, 1890) was a surgeon, veteran of the American Civil War, and the first black professor of medicine in the United States. After gaining his medical education in Toronto, Canada West from 1850 to 1856, he set up a practice there. He returned to the United States shortly before the start of the American Civil War.

Augusta offered his services to the United States Army and in 1863, he was commissioned as major and the Army's first African-American physician; he became the first black hospital administrator in U.S. history while serving in the army. He left the army in 1866 at the rank of brevet lieutenant colonel.

In 1868 Augusta was the first African American to be appointed to the faculty of Howard University and the first to any medical college in the United States.

Biography
Augusta was born in 1825 to free people of color in Norfolk, Virginia. As a young man, he began to learn to read while working as a barber, although it was illegal for free blacks to do so in Virginia at that time. The state had restricted rights of free people of color following the Nat Turner slave rebellion of 1831.

Augusta moved to Baltimore while still in his youth. He also began pursuing an education in the field of medicine. He married Baltimore native Mary O. Burgoin on January 12, 1847.

Medical training
Augusta applied to study medicine at the University of Pennsylvania but was refused admission. Although he faced institutionalized racism throughout his career, the university cited inadequate preparation in its rejection of him. Augusta persisted in his education and arranged for private instruction from a doctor on the faculty. As he was determined to become a physician, Augusta travelled to California and earned the funds to pursue his goal of becoming a doctor.

Concerned that he would not be allowed to enroll in medical school in the U.S., in 1850 he enrolled at Trinity College of the University of Toronto. He also conducted business as a druggist and chemist. Six years later he received a degree in medicine.

Medical career
Augusta remained in Toronto, Canada West, establishing a medical practice. The City of Toronto appointed him as director of an industrial school. He supported local antislavery activities, which supported the American movement. He also founded the Provincial Association for the Education and Elevation of the Coloured People of Canada, a literary society that donated books and other school supplies to black children. Augusta left Canada for the West Indies in about 1860, returning to Baltimore at the beginning of the American Civil War in 1861.

American Civil War
Augusta went to Washington, D.C., where he wrote President Abraham Lincoln and Edwin Stanton, Secretary of War,  offering his services as a surgeon. He was initially rejected due to his racial background and, since he was a British subject, would violate the Great Britain's Proclamation of Neutrality. In response, he traveled to Washington, DC, to plead his case.

The Army Medical Board reconsidered and invited him to take the examination.  He passed the test on 14 April 1863 and received a major's commission as surgeon for African-American troops. He was the United States Army's first African-American physician (of a total of eight) and its highest-ranking African-American officer at the time. He was also appointed to lead the Freedman's Hospital in Washington, D.C., in 1863, becoming the first black hospital administrator in U.S. history.

Some whites resented Augusta's having such a high rank. He was mobbed in Baltimore while wearing his officer's uniform during May 1863 (where three people were arrested for assault), and in another incident in Washington. On October 2, 1863, he was commissioned Regimental Surgeon of the Seventh U.S. Colored Troops. In March 1865, he was awarded a brevet promotion to lieutenant colonel, and left the military service the following year at that rank.

Activism against discrimination
While in the military, Augusta spoke out about discrimination suffered by African Americans in society. On February 1, 1864, Augusta wrote to Judge Advocate Captain C. W. Clippington about discrimination against African-American passengers on the streetcars of Washington, D.C.:

His letter was printed in New York and Washington newspapers. On February 10, 1864, Massachusetts Senator Charles Sumner introduced a resolution in Congress:

To support his resolution, Sumner read to the assemblage Dr. Augusta's letter.
Edward Bates, the Attorney General in President Abraham Lincoln's cabinet, belittled the incident and senators who supported Sumner. He was a slaveholder but earlier in his career in St. Louis, Missouri, Bates had acted as defense counsel for enslaved persons in freedom suits.

In 1865 Augusta wrote a letter to Major General Lewis Wallace, protesting the unequal treatment of African-American train passengers, who were forced to sit in segregated sections. That letter preceded the Plessy v. Ferguson case which challenged racial segregation on public transportation in the U.S. On March 13, 1865, Augusta was brevetted to the rank of lieutenant colonel.

On February 26, 1868, Augusta testified before the United States Congressional Committee on the District of Columbia with regard to Mrs. Kate Brown. Mrs. Brown, an employee of Congress and an African American, had been injured when an employee of the Alexandria, Washington, and Georgetown Railroad forcibly ejected her from a passenger car. The railroad was prohibited by its federal charter from discrimination against passengers because of race.

Later years
Mustering out of the service in October 1866, Augusta accepted an assignment with the Freedmen's Bureau, heading the agency's Lincoln Hospital in Savannah, Georgia. While there, he encouraged African-American self-help, urged the freedmen to support independent institutions, and gained respect from the city's white physicians.

Augusta returned to private practice in Washington, D.C. He was attending surgeon to the Smallpox Hospital in Washington in 1870. He also served on the staff of the local Freedmen's Hospital, which he had directed for a period during the war.

Augusta taught anatomy in the recently organized medical department at Howard University from November 8, 1868, to July 1877, becoming the first African American appointed to the faculty of the school and also of any medical college in the U.S. He received honorary degrees of M.D. in 1869 and A.M. in 1871 from Howard in recognition of his contributions.

Despite his accomplishments, Dr Augusta was repeatedly refused admission to the local society of physicians. On June 9, 1869, Augusta and Charles Burleigh Purvis were proposed for membership of the Medical Society of DC, a branch of the American Medical Association. They were considered eligible, but did not receive enough votes. Another black physician, A. W. Tucker, was proposed on June 23, but was also rejected. In response, these three formed the National Medical Society. Augusta feared such exclusion from a professional society would impede the progress of younger African-American physicians in the city, and worked against such racial discrimination.

He died in Washington on December 21, 1890. He was interred at Arlington National Cemetery, in Arlington, Virginia.

Augusta's headstone reads as follows: "Commissioned surgeon of colored volunteers, April 4, 1863, with the rank of Major. Commissioned regimental surgeon of the 7th Regiment of US. Colored Troops, October 2, 1863.
Brevet Lieutenant Colonel of Volunteers, March 13, 1865, for faithful and meritorious services-mustered out October 13, 1866."

See also

 List of African-American firsts

References

External links

1825 births
1890 deaths
African-American academics
African Americans in the American Civil War
Military personnel from Norfolk, Virginia
Physicians from Baltimore
University of Toronto alumni
Burials at Arlington National Cemetery
African-American physicians
Union Army surgeons
Academics from Virginia
Academics from Maryland
People of Virginia in the American Civil War
Trinity College (Canada) alumni